The 2021 West Alabama Tigers football team represented the University of West Alabama as a member of the Gulf South Conference (GSC) during the 2021 NCAA Division II football season. They were led by eight-year head coach Brett Gilliland. The Tigers played their home games at Tiger Stadium in Livingston, Alabama.

Schedule

The result against North American University on September 16 was the largest victory margin in the team's history. The game against North American University is not included in the Gulf South Conference standings because it was classed as an exhibition game and was not countable due to NCAA policies.

This was the first time that the team had won five games in a row at the start of a season.

Notes

Game summaries

Morehouse

at Tuskegee

North American

at Mississippi College

at No. 9 West Georgia

at Shorter

No. 4 Valdosta State

Delta State

at North Greenville

No. 4 West Florida

Mississippi College

Rankings

References

West Alabama
West Alabama Tigers football seasons
West Alabama Tigers football